Hugo Miguel Alves Machado (born 4 July 1982 in Lisbon) is a Portuguese footballer who plays for Clube Oriental de Lisboa as an attacking midfielder.

Club statistics

References

External links

Barreirense official profile 
Persian League stats

1982 births
Living people
Portuguese footballers
Footballers from Lisbon
Association football midfielders
Primeira Liga players
Liga Portugal 2 players
Segunda Divisão players
Sporting CP B players
C.F. Estrela da Amadora players
F.C. Barreirense players
Associação Naval 1º de Maio players
Clube Oriental de Lisboa players
Real S.C. players
GS Loures players
C.D. Cova da Piedade players
Cypriot First Division players
Apollon Limassol FC players
Olympiakos Nicosia players
Alki Larnaca FC players
Azerbaijan Premier League players
FK Standard Sumgayit players
Persian Gulf Pro League players
Zob Ahan Esfahan F.C. players
Sanat Naft Abadan F.C. players
I-League players
Churchill Brothers FC Goa players
Football League (Greece) players
Kallithea F.C. players
OFI Crete F.C. players
Portuguese expatriate footballers
Expatriate footballers in Cyprus
Expatriate footballers in Azerbaijan
Expatriate footballers in Iran
Expatriate footballers in India
Expatriate footballers in Greece
Portuguese expatriate sportspeople in Cyprus
Portuguese expatriate sportspeople in Azerbaijan
Portuguese expatriate sportspeople in Iran
Portuguese expatriate sportspeople in India
Portuguese expatriate sportspeople in Greece